Marvin Thomson (January 26, 1923 – April 17, 1967) was an American cyclist. He competed in the tandem event at the 1948 Summer Olympics.

References

External links
 

1923 births
1967 deaths
American male cyclists
Olympic cyclists of the United States
Cyclists at the 1948 Summer Olympics
Cyclists from Chicago